The Audi 100 Coupé S is a sports fastback coupe Grand tourer class car manufactured by the German automaker Audi AG. The car was first presented at the Frankfurt Motor Show in 1969. Originally 30,687 units were produced.

Technical specifications 
The car came with a 4-cylinder in-line engine with a capacity of 1871 cc and was initially equipped with two carburetors with power output of 115 hp. In 1972, it changed to a single carburetor with 112 hp output.

Gallery

Coupé S V3/V4 
In 1973, Audi, together with Porsche, developed two prototypes based on the Audi 100 Coupé S. The first was named the "V3". It was equipped with a 928 prototype V8 engine with a power of 350 hp as well as the 928's rear wheel drive running gear. It had wide flared fenders to fit the wider track. The "V4" was another 100 Coupé S with the body widened by 4.3 inches to accommodate the 928's running gear and wider track.

See also 

 Audi 100
 Audi S and RS models
 Ford Mustang
 Porsche 911
 Audi A5
 Audi A7

References

External links

 motortrend.com Audi design: New home, new processes

100
Mid-size cars
Executive cars
Coupés
Rear-wheel-drive vehicles
Cars introduced in 1968
1960s cars
1970s cars